Anastasios "Soulis" Markopoulos (born March 1, 1949) is a Greek former professional basketball player and a professional basketball coach. He last coached Aris of the Greek Basket League.

Playing career
Markopoulos played basketball with the Greek clubs Olympos Saranta Ekklision and Dimokritos.

Coaching career
Markopoulos has coached, in his career, teams such as: Iraklis, PAOK, Aris, Makedonikos, AEK, and Maroussi. His most remarkable success was the acquisition of the FIBA Korać Cup title, while with PAOK Bravo in the 1993–94 season. In the Greek Basket League 2007–08 season, while coaching Maroussi, and qualifying to the semifinals of the Greek Basket League, he was voted the Greek League Best Coach.

He was also named the Greek League Best Coach in 2014. In the summer of 2014, he extended his contract with PAOK through the 2018–19 season.
On 26 May 2017, PAOK announced the end of their cooperation with Markopoulos working as the club's head coach.

Personal life
Markopoulos' son, Charis, is also a professional basketball coach, and former professional basketball player.

References

External links
EuroCup Official Coaching Profile
Greek League Coaching Profile
The top of the Greek Benches: Soulis Markopoulos 

1949 births
Living people
AEK B.C. coaches
Aris B.C. coaches
Greek basketball coaches
Greek men's basketball players
Greek Basket League players
Iraklis Thessaloniki B.C. coaches
Makedonikos B.C. coaches
Maroussi B.C. coaches
P.A.O.K. BC coaches
Basketball players from Thessaloniki